The thirteenth season of the American police procedural television series NCIS: Los Angeles premiered on October 10, 2021, on CBS, for the 2021–22 television season, and ended on May 22, 2022.

NCIS: Los Angeles follows a fictional team of special agents from the Office of Special Projects of the Naval Criminal Investigative Service. The series stars Chris O'Donnell, Daniela Ruah, Eric Christian Olsen, Medalion Rahimi, Caleb Castille, Gerald McRaney, and LL Cool J. McRaney was promoted to series regular prior to the season following the departures of Barrett Foa and Renée Felice Smith after the previous season and Linda Hunt this season. The season consisted of 22 episodes and includes the 300th episode of the series.

Cast and characters

Main
 Chris O'Donnell as Grisha "G." Callen, NCIS Supervisory Special Agent (SSA) and Team leader
 Daniela Ruah as Kensi Blye, NCIS Special Agent
 Eric Christian Olsen as Marty Deeks, NCIS Investigator (Previously LAPD/NCIS Liaison Officer)
 Medalion Rahimi as Fatima Namazi, NCIS Special Agent
 Caleb Castille as Devin Roundtree, NCIS Special Agent (Previously FBI Agent)
 Gerald McRaney as Hollace Kilbride, a retired Admiral and friend of Henrietta Lange, later Operations Manager 
 LL Cool J as Sam Hanna, NCIS Senior Field Agent, Second in Command

Recurring
 Olesya Rulin as Zasha Gagarin, former Russian spy
 Elizabeth Bogush as Joelle Taylor, CIA Agent and former girlfriend of Callen
 Duncan Campbell as NCIS Special Agent Castor
 Briana Marin as Aliyah de León, NCIS Supervisory Special Agent
 Peter Cambor as Nate Getz, NCIS Special Agent and Operational Psychologist
 Kavi Ramachandran Ladnier as Shyla Dahr, NCIS Reserve Agent
 Bar Paly as Anatasia 'Anna' Kolcheck, Former ATF Agent and Callen's girlfriend, later fiancée
 Vyto Ruginis as Arkady Kolcheck, former KGB Operative, associate of Callen, and Anna's father
 Sasha Clements as Katya Miranova, nemesis of Callen and Anna
 Natalia Del Riego as Rosa Reyes, migrant seeking asylum, later fostered by Kensi and Deeks
 Josie Navar as Pilar, migrant aided by Kensi and Deeks
 Christine Horn as Elliot Reynolds, social worker aiding asylum candidates
 Cyd Strittmatter as Janice King, foster inspector and coordinator
 Richard Gant as former Colonel Raymond Hanna, father of Sam

Guest
 Linda Hunt as Henrietta Lange, NCIS Supervisory Special Agent (SSA) and Operations Manager
 Jolene Key as NCIS Special Agent Afloat Denise Morgan
 Stephanie Lemelin as Retired Marine Gunnery Sergeant Mary Smith
 Bill Goldberg as Lance Hamilton, DOJ Agent
 Erik Palladino as Special Deputy U.S. Marshal Vostanik Sabatino
 Karina Logue as LAPD Detective Ellen Whiting, Internal Affairs
 Jeff Kober as Harris Keane, former member of Hetty's team during the Vietnam War
 Ava McCoy as Jordyn Roundtree, sister of Devin
 Ashwin Gore as ONI Inspector General Akhil Ali
 Jere Burns as Arnold Baines, former Soviet training officer at the Institute of Noble Maidens and former CIA Agent in charge of the Drona Project
 Mercedes Mason as Talia del Campo, DEA Agent

Episodes

Production

Development
On April 23, 2021, it was announced that CBS had renewed NCIS: Los Angeles for a thirteenth season. Series regular Eric Christian Olsen wrote the nineteenth episode of the season, while fellow series regular Daniela Ruah directed the episode. On January 5, 2022, it was reported that production had been suspended until February due to the COVID Omicron variant.

Casting
When the series was renewed, in was announced that series stars Chris O'Donnell and LL Cool J had signed deals to return. On May 24, 2021, it was revealed that Barrett Foa and Renée Felice Smith would be leaving the series after the twelfth season. Later that day it was confirmed that Linda Hunt would be returning for the season, after only appearing occasionally during the previous season. However, Hunt only appeared in the season premiere, and was absent for the rest of the season. On June 2, 2021, it was announced that Gerald McRaney had been promoted to series regular for the season.

Release
On May 19, 2021, it was announced that the series would keep its Sunday 9:00 PM ET timeslot. On July 12, 2021, it was revealed that the season would premiere on October 10, 2021. The series continued to air after The Equalizer leading into SEAL Team for its first four episodes. Afterwards, the series led into S.W.A.T.

In the United Kingdom, Season 13 of NCIS: Los Angeles gave up its traditional December premiere slot to allow the final season of NCIS: New Orleans to be aired, on April 27, 2022 Sky Max set the Season 13 premiere date for May 15, 2022.

Ratings

Home media

Notes

References

External links

13
2021 American television seasons
2022 American television seasons